Paul Pavlovich (born March 3, 1970) is an American artist, graphic designer, and musician. Currently living in St. Petersburg, Florida, he is best known as the first lead singer for the  anarchist grindcore band Assück which he co-founded in 1987. In October 2008, IGN Entertainment named Pavlovich one of the '10 Best Death Metal Singers' stating "In terms of the guys doing the deeper or what some fans call "guttural" vocal style, Pavlovich is in an elite class."

Career
Since his departure from the band in 1992, Pavlovich shifted his attention to visual art and design. After graduating from the Ringling School of Art and Design in 1994, Pavlovich spent a period of time in New York City developing his unique system of painting and image making.  During his short residence in the Park Slope neighborhood of Brooklyn, New York Pavlovich spent several months rehearsing with the band Cattle Press (Hydra Head Records).

Pavlovich returned to the Tampa Bay Area with a developed body of artwork which he began showing in group shows. In 2002 Pavlovich was selected to show several works at the Tampa Museum of Art. In 2004 Pavlovich was approached by curator Timothy Warner of the Covivant Gallery in Tampa who was interested in organizing Pavlovich's first solo exhibit of work entitled "Temporary Past Life" which received praise from national and local media. Pavlovich continues his visual work which has been widely seen in both print and web-media.

In late 2004, Pavlovich was asked by longtime friend and guitarist Sam Williams to contribute vocals to a recording project called Track the Curse. In 2006, the album The New Land was released by the Tennessee label Spins Good Records.

He is currently playing with Exitsect, a band which also features Sam Williams, along with Frank Watkins and Joe Kiser.

Pavlovich appeared as a guest vocalist on the 2014 album, Longhena, by technical grindcore band Gridlink, contributing on the track "Chalk Maple".

In 2018, Pavlovich founded his own label called Roman Numeral Records, and also formed a new grindcore band called Alphanumeric, whose debut EP was released in 2019 through Roman Numeral.

Vocal discography (Assück)
Born Backwards (Demo, 1987) (self-released)
Necrosalvation (EP, 1988) (Rigid Records / Ripping Headaches Records)
Assuck/Old Lady Drivers (Split EP, 1990) (No System Records)
Anticapital (LP, 1991) (Sound Pollution Records / Common Cause Records)
Bllleeeeaaauuurrrrgghhh! - The Record (VA 7-inch, 1991) (Slap A Ham Records)
"Apocalyptic Convulsions" compilation 10-inch (some copies came with a bonus 7-inch record) (1992) (Ax/ction Records)
State to State (Single and Spoken Word, 1992) (SOA Records)
Blindspot (EP, 1992) (Open Records / Schematics Records)
"Emergency Broadcast Systems Volume Two" compilation 7-inch EP w/ Assück, Crain, Schedule, and Friction (1992) (Allied Recordings)
Tampa Sucks Compilation (VA CD, 1993)
Bloodless Unreality - Assuck/Hellnation/Destroy/Confrontation (Split EP, 1994) (Forfeit Records)
"No Idea Fanzine 11 Compilation CD - Big Pants Waste Precious Fabric" (1994) (No Idea Records)
Blindspot Mailorder Distro Sampler (VA CD, 1995)	(No Idea Records / Toybox Records)
Worlds - "Unforeseen Paths"  (Cassette, 2010) (Financial Ruin Records) (Guest Vocal on 3 tracks)

Vocal discography (Track the Curse )The New Land (CD, 2006)	(Spins Good Records)They've Taken Everything'' (VA CD, 2007)	(Profane Existence)

References

External links
 Gig Posters Design Samples
 Assück Metal Archives
 Assuck Discography

1970 births
Living people
American artists
American graphic designers
American heavy metal singers
Grindcore musicians